Events in the year 1894 in Germany.

Incumbents

National level
 Kaiser – Wilhelm II
 Chancellor – Leo von Caprivi to 26 October, then from 29 October Chlodwig, Prince of Hohenlohe-Schillingsfürst

State level

Kingdoms
 King of Bavaria – Otto of Bavaria
 King of Prussia – Kaiser Wilhelm II
 King of Saxony – Albert of Saxony
 King of Württemberg – William II of Württemberg

Grand Duchies
 Grand Duke of Baden – Frederick I
 Grand Duke of Hesse – Ernest Louis
 Grand Duke of Mecklenburg-Schwerin – Frederick Francis III
 Grand Duke of Mecklenburg-Strelitz – Frederick William
 Grand Duke of Oldenburg – Peter II
 Grand Duke of Saxe-Weimar-Eisenach – Charles Alexander

Principalities
 Schaumburg-Lippe – George, Prince of Schaumburg-Lippe
 Schwarzburg-Rudolstadt – Günther Victor, Prince of Schwarzburg-Rudolstadt
 Schwarzburg-Sondershausen – Karl Günther, Prince of Schwarzburg-Sondershausen
 Principality of Lippe – Woldemar, Prince of Lippe
 Reuss Elder Line – Heinrich XXII, Prince Reuss of Greiz
 Reuss Younger Line – Heinrich XIV, Prince Reuss Younger Line
 Waldeck and Pyrmont – Friedrich, Prince of Waldeck and Pyrmont

Duchies
 Duke of Anhalt – Frederick I, Duke of Anhalt
 Duke of Brunswick – Prince Albert of Prussia (regent)
 Duke of Saxe-Altenburg – Ernst I, Duke of Saxe-Altenburg
 Duke of Saxe-Coburg and Gotha – Alfred, Duke of Saxe-Coburg and Gotha
 Duke of Saxe-Meiningen – Georg II, Duke of Saxe-Meiningen

Colonial Governors
 Cameroon (Kamerun) – Leist to 24 February, then Eugen von Zimmerer (4th and final term) to 31 December, then Jesko von Puttkamer (3rd term)
 German East Africa (Deutsch-Ostafrika) – Friedrich Radbod Freiher von Schele
 German New Guinea (Deutsch-Neuguinea) – Gerog Schmiele (Landeshauptleute of the German New Guinea Company)
 German South-West Africa (Deutsch-Südwestafrika) – Curt von François (Landeshauptleute) to 15 March, then Theodor Leutwein (Landeshauptleute)
 Togoland – Jesko von Puttkamer (Landeshauptleute) (2nd term)

Events
 1 October – Leipziger Volkszeitung is first published.

Undated
 The Reichstag building in Berlin is completed and opened.
 The German company Wintershall is founded.

Births
 11 March – Otto Grotewohl, German politician (died 1964)
 1 April – Eduard Wagner, German general (died 1944)
 11 April – Fritz Lindemann, German officer (died 1944)
 14 April – Fritz Thiele, German member of the German resistance who served as the communications chief of the German Army (died 1944)
 30 July – Gerda Müller, German actress (died 1951)
 17 August – Otto Suhr, German politician (died 1957)
 19 August – Joseph Müller, German Roman Catholic priest (died 1944)
 20 August – Josef Straßberger, German weightlifter (died 1950)
 6 September – Carl Grossberg, German painter (died 1940)
 12 September – Friedrich Ebert Jr., German politician (died 1979)
 15 September – Herbert Windt, German composer (died 1965)
 14 October – Heinrich Lübke, German politician (died 1972)
 2 November – Alexander Lippisch, German aeronautical engineer, pioneer of aerodynamics (died 1976)
 19 November – Heinz Hopf, German mathematician (died 1971)
 17 December – Hans Henny Jahnn, German playwright and novelist (died 1959)
 19 December – Paul Dessau, German conductor and composer (died 1979)
 21 December – Gustav Ehrhart, German chemist (died 1971)

Deaths
 1 January – Heinrich Hertz, German physicist (born 1857)
 11 January:
Wilhelm von Freeden, German mathematician (born 1822)
Joseph Weyland, German bishop of Roman Catholic Church (born 1826)
 12 February – Hans von Bülow, German conductor, virtuoso pianist, and composer (born 1830)
 20 February – Georg Albert Lücke, German surgeon (born 1829)
 11 April – Constantin Lipsius, German architect (born 1832)
 21 May – August Kundt, German physicist (born 1839)
 8 September – Hermann von Helmholtz, German physician (born 1821)
 17 October – Ludwig von Henk, German naval officer (born 1820)

References

 
Years of the 19th century in Germany
Germany
Germany